Elaine Matthews BA BPhil (19 August 1942 - 26 June 2011) was a British classical scholar at the University of Oxford and one of the principal contributors to the Lexicon of Greek Personal Names.

Education and career
Matthews was an alumna of St Hilda's College, Oxford, where she took a BA in Literae Humaniores (1960–64) and was a pupil of Barbara Levick. She went on to take the MPhil (then BPhil) in Ancient History, working on Lucian. After a break to raise her two daughters, Matthews embarked on a research career in Greek onomastics at the University of Oxford. In 2010, after she had retired, she was the dedicatee of a Festschrift on Ancient Greek personal names in honour of her distinguished career, containing a collection of scholarly essays on Greek onomastics but with an appreciation of Matthews as a scholar by Alan Bowman as its first chapter.

She was a supernumerary fellow of St Hilda's College, Oxford, from 1996 and was honorary secretary for the Society for the Promotion of Roman Studies, of which she was also a trustee, for twenty-one years.

Personal life
Matthews was born in Netherton, Yorkshire, but grew up in Birmingham. Her father was a police officer. She died of cancer, aged 68, in 2011.

Selected publications
 A Lexicon of Greek Personal Names I-IV (with Simon Hornblower). Oxford: Clarendon Press, 1987–2005.
 Greek Personal Names: Their Value as Evidence (with Simon Hornblower). Proceedings of the British Academy 104. Oxford: Oxford University Press, 2000.
 Old and New Worlds in Greek Onomastics. Edited by Elaine Matthews. Proceedings of the British Academy 148. Oxford: Oxford University Press, 2007.

External links
 Lexicon of Greek Personal Names (Oxford Classics Faculty page)
 Lexicon of Greek Personal Names (project website)

References

Classical scholars of the University of Oxford
1942 births
2011 deaths
British lexicographers
British women writers